Tertius Losper (born 22 November 1985 in Windhoek) is a Namibian rugby union fullback. He is a member of the Namibia national rugby union team and participated with the squad at the 2007 and 2011 Rugby World Cups.

References

1985 births
Living people
Blue Bulls players
Namibia international rugby union players
Namibian Afrikaner people
Namibian rugby union players
Rugby union fullbacks
Rugby union players from Windhoek
White Namibian people